Ilkka Tapani Alanko (born 21 November 1969) is a Finnish musician. He is a lead vocalist, co-founder, songwriter, and guitarist for the Finnish rock band Neljä Ruusua. Alanko's debut solo album Elektra was released in 2009, and it peaked at number seven on the Finnish Albums Chart.

Alanko is also a founder of the eponymous ensemble Ilkka Alanko Orchestra. In 2010, the orchestra released its debut album Ruusuja, which also spawned a television documentary Ilkka Alanko Orchestra – Poplaulajan työpäivä.

In 2010, Alanko won the talent show Kuorosota, the Finnish version of Clash of the Choirs, with his choir.

Personal life 
Alanko's older siblings Ismo, Petri, and Satu are also musicians.

Alanko is married to his long-time partner Tessa. They have two children, born in 2005 and 2008.

Discography

Neljä Ruusua

Neljä baritonia 
 "Pop-musiikkia" (1997)

Solo career

Albums 
 Elektra (2009)

Singles 
 "Kesä meidän" (2008)
 "Sattuu" (2009)
 "Etsin sua" (2009)
 "Kullanhuuhtoja" (2009)
 "Linnunpoika" (2010)

Ilkka Alanko Orchestra

Albums 
 Ruusuja (2010)

Singles 
 "Poplaulajan vapaapäivä" (2010)
 "Uusi aika" (2010, feat. Irina)
 "Elän vain kerran" (2011)
 "2011" (2011)

Source:

References

External links 
  
 

1969 births
Living people
Finnish rock guitarists
Finnish rock singers
Finnish songwriters
People from Joensuu
20th-century Finnish male singers
21st-century Finnish male singers